Bangladesh Customs is the principal customs agency of Bangladesh.

History
Bangladesh Customs was formed under the National Board of Revenue in 1972 after the Independence of Bangladesh through the Customs Act. In 2016 Bangladesh Customs joined Operation IRENE to stop illegal trafficking of small arms and drugs.

Intelligence branch
Bangladesh Customs has an intelligence division,  responsible for preventing smuggling and tariff evasions. In 2016 it started operations to recover cars bought and sold in Bangladesh evading taxes, the cars were bought in by Foreign officials working in International agencies such as the World Bank and various agencies of the United Nations.

References

Government agencies of Bangladesh
Revenue services
Government agencies established in 1972
1972 establishments in Bangladesh